Taiktaw Monastery is a royal Buddhist monastery in Mandalay, Burma, known for its bold wooden carvings. The central building was the residence of the Thathanabaing, and the posts were taken from the Amarapura Palace. It was built by King Mindon Min in 1859, and was used under the Burmese monarchy as the official residence of the Thathanabaing.

Taiktaw Monastery was located close to the eastern gate into Mandalay Palace.

See also

Kyaung
Atumashi Monastery
Shwenandaw Monastery
Myadaung Monastery
Salin Monastery

Notes

References

Monasteries in Myanmar
Buddhist temples in Mandalay
19th-century Buddhist temples
Religious buildings and structures completed in 1859